Rufachola is a genus of moths of the family Noctuidae.

Notes
Natural History Museum Lepidoptera genus database

Cuculliinae